Zealandopterix is a genus of small primitive metallic moths in the family Micropterigidae.

Species
Zealandopterix zonodoxa (Meyrick, 1888)

References

Micropterigidae
Moth genera